Duncan Robinson may refer to:

Duncan Robinson (art historian) (1943–2022), British art historian
Duncan Robinson (basketball) (born 1994), American basketball player

See also
Twin Towers (San Antonio Spurs), basketball duo of Tim Duncan and David Robinson